Nesprin-2 is a protein that in humans is encoded by the SYNE2 gene. The human SYNE2 gene consists of 116 exons and encodes nesprin-2, a member of the nuclear envelope (NE) spectrin-repeat (nesprin) family. Nesprins are modular proteins with a central extended spectrin-repeat (SR) rod domain and a C-terminal Klarsicht/ANC-1/Syne homology (KASH) transmembrane domain, which acts as a NE-targeting motif. Nesprin-2 (Nesp2) binds to cytoplasmic F-actin, tethering the nucleus to the cytoskeleton and maintaining the structural integrity of the nucleus.

The human SYNE2 gene encodes a protein of 6,885 amino acids (isoform 1, Nesp2 giant); alternative mRNA splicing produces transcripts encoding a larger isoform and numerous smaller isoforms, some of which are specific to various tissues; alternative start and termination sites within the mRNA also allow translation of smaller isoforms, many possessing unique N- or C-terminal sequences encoded by retained introns. Two mechanisms create splice variants of nesprin-2 with the KASH domain deleted (deltaKASH). In deltaKASH1 variants, deletion of cassette exons 111-112 results in a frame shift that disrupts the KASH domain but retains the 3' untranslated region (UTR) in exon 116 utilized for isoforms containing the KASH domain. This mechanism, which also occurs in SYNE1 mRNA encoding nesprin-1 (enaptin), generates deltaKASH1 isoforms terminating with a distinct 11-amino acid tail (GIAGHSATPPA replacing YPMLRYTNGPPPT in isoforms with KASH). Utilization of an alternative stop codon in exon 115, which is followed by a distinct 3' UTR, generates deltaKASH2 variants. This mechanism truncates larger isoforms without generating a distinct C-terminal sequence. Expression of deltaKASH1 variants occurs largely in brain and kidney, with smaller amounts in heart; deltaKASH2 variants are detected in heart and spleen.

References

Further reading